Sue Records was also the name of a Louisiana-based record company which owned Jewel Records (Shreveport record label).
Sue Records ("The Sound of Soul") was an American record label founded by Henry 'Juggy' Murray and Bobby Robinson in 1957. Subsidiaries on the label were Symbol Records, Crackerjack Records, Broadway Records and Eastern Records. Sue also financed and distributed A.F.O. Records owned by Harold Battiste in New Orleans.

History
In 1957, Juggy Murray partnered with Bobby Robinson to create Sue Records in New York City. The label's first release was "Vengeance (Will Be Mine)" by the Matadors later that year. Sue's first hit record came in 1958 with "Itchy Twitchy Feeling" by Bobby Hendricks which peaked at #25 on the Billboard Hot 100. Success continued into the sixties with a handful of singles by R&B duo Ike & Tina Turner between 1960 and 1962. "Mockingbird" by brother-and-sister duo Inez and Charlie Foxx was a hit on the subsidiary label Symbol in 1963. Sue also had hits on the charts with "Stick Shift" by the Duals, "Hurt by Love" by Inez Foxx and "That's How Heartaches Are Made" by Justine "Baby" Washington. Sue also released early recordings by the soul singer Don Covay and albums by the soul-jazz organist Jimmy McGriff. Guitarist Jimi Hendrix signed his first recording contract with Sue in 1965, but no recordings were released.

Murray initially released his records in the UK through Decca's London Records but switched to a licensing deal with Island Records in 1964. This deal resulted in a split in the ownership of the Sue name. Island used the label to distribute Sue in the UK.  Problems began when Island also leased discs from other US labels that interested them and released them on UK Sue too - which was not in the agreement. Murray terminated the agreement and returned to Decca in 1966.

After failing to chart in the U.S., Murray sold the Sue masters to United Artists Records in 1968. A reissue of the "Harlem Shuffle" by Bob & Earl made the Top 10 in Britain in 1969. Murray retained rights to the Sue name and constantly attempted to re-activate the label until his death in 2005. The Sue Records catalog eventually ended up with EMI, and then with Universal Music Group upon EMI's being bought out in 2012.

EMI released a 4-CD box-set The Sue Records Story: The Sound of Soul in 1994, while Ace Records later released four volumes of The UK Sue Label Story.

Discography
Sue Records were best known for their R&B and Rock 'n' Roll singles but released a number of LPs between 1958 and 1966 featuring popular and jazz artists.

Sue LP-2000 Popular/R&B Series

Sue LP/STLP-1000 Popular/Jazz Series

Other Releases
LP-3001: Thank You, Lord - National Independent Gospel Singers of Atlanta Georgia (1960)
LP-8000: Things with Strings - Julie & Jack (1963)
SSLP-8801: Let's Work Together - Wilbert Harrison

Selected singles

Subsidiary labels

Symbol Records 
Symbol was launched in 1958 and lasted until 1966. The label issued 47 singles and one album, most which were produced by Murray. Brother-and-sister duo Inez & Charlie Foxx were the label's most successful artist. Their hit single, "Mockingbird" reached #2 on the Billboard R&B chart and #7 Billboard Hot 100 in the summer of 1963. Inez Foxx had a few solo singles reach the charts. It wasn't until 1966, that another artist on the label had a hit record. "She Blew a Good Thing" by The Poets peaked at #45 on the pop chart and #2 on the R&B chart. Artist who recorded on the label include King Coleman, Art Lassiter, the Hollywood Flames, the Shockettes, and the Parliaments.

Albums 

 1963: Inez Foxx – Mockingbird

Selected singles

Crackerjack Records 
Crackerjack was launched in 1961 and released its last record in 1964. Artist on that label included The Spy Dels, Ike Turner's Kings Of Rhythm, Eddie Carlton, Linda And The Del Rios, Pearl Woods, The Dramatics, Derek Martin, Chuck Leonard, and Betty Green.

Eastern Records 
Eastern was launched in 1964 and lasted until 1966. The label produced the singles "The Real Thing" by Tina Britt which reached #20 on the R&B chart in 1965, and "Time Waits For No One" by Eddie & Ernie which reached #34 on the R&B chart in 1965. Geraldine Jones, Johnny Starr, and Duke Daniels also recorded on the label.

Broadway Records 
Singles were released on Broadway between 1964 and 1966. Artists on the label included Tommy Andre, Johnson Sisters, Ocie Smith, Sandra Phillips, The Inverts, Johnny Burton, and The Thieves.

See also
 List of record labels
 Sue Records artists with Wikipedia pages

References

External links
The Sue Records story from BSN Pubs

American record labels
Record labels established in 1957
New York (state) record labels
Rhythm and blues record labels
Pop record labels
Defunct record labels of the United States